{{DISPLAYTITLE:C8H19NO}}
The molecular formula C8H19NO (molar mass: 145.24 g/mol) may refer to:

 N,N-Diisopropylaminoethanol (DIPA)
 Heptaminol

Molecular formulas